Anita Delgado Briones (1890–1962) was a Spanish flamenco dancer and singer from Andalusia who achieved fame for having married the Indian Maharaja of Kapurthala, thus becoming a Rani of Kapurthala.

Biography
She was born on 8 February 1890 in Málaga. The family emigrated to Madrid, where her beauty and that of her sister, Victoria, were welcomed. Painters Julio Romero de Torres and Ricardo Baroja asked that they model, but Anita refused being only 16.

During the marriage ceremony of king Alfonso XIII of Spain in Madrid, Sir Jagatjit Singh Sahib Bahadur, the Maharaja of the princely state of Kapurthala watched her performances in a cafe-concert. He seduced her and stayed with her throughout the wedding but left after the bombing of the royal couple (31 May 1906). Later, however, her friends Romero de Torres, Ramón María del Valle-Inclán and Pastora Imperio convinced her to further meet him in Paris. He had her educated (including in French) in order that he could explain his love for her. They married on 28 January 1908. After a Sikh marriage in India, she changed her name to Rani Prem Kaur Sahiba.

They later travelled in Europe and India, and she wrote a book about this time called "Impresiones de mis viajes a las Indias". She also gave the Maharaja a son, Maharajkumar Ajit Singh Sahib Bahadur (born 26 April 1908, educated at Cambridge University and at the Military Academy, Dehradun. Assistant to the Indian Trade Commissioner in Argentina, died in 1982). During the First World War, her husband worked in Franco-British hospitals. They separated after the Maharaja married his sixth wife and as a result, Delgado stayed in Paris living secretly with her secretary in order that her allowance continued. A ship carrying her jewels to France sank en route. The jewels are said to be worth millions. She died on 7 July 1962 in Madrid.

In the media
A movie on Anita's life titled La princesa de Kapurthala starring the Spanish actress Penélope Cruz was slated to begin shooting in 2006. However a descendant of Jagatjit Singh, Shatrujit Singh, has opposed the filming since he considers that Javier Moro's novel on which it is based distorts truth, especially the allegations of the Maharajah forcing Anita to have an abortion.

Gallery

Literature 
 Elisa Vázquez de Gey. Anita Delgado. Maharani of Kapurthala. (1998) Editorial Planeta 
 Elisa Vázquez de Gey. The Maharanis’ Dream. (2005) Editorial Grijalbo  and  
 Elisa Vázquez de Gey. The Princess of Kapurthala. (2008) Editorial Planeta  
 Javier Moro. Pasión india. (2005) Editorial Seix Barral 
 Manuel Ocón Dueñas: Anita Delgado. Ed. Arguval. 1986.

References

External links

 The Kapurthala Princess (English)
 La Princesa de Kapurthala (Spanish)
 Radio podcast dedicated to the life of the Princess of Kapurthala, Anita Delgado by Radio Nacional de España (Spanish)
 Video documentary about the life of Anita Delgado (Spanish)
 

Flamenco dancers
Kapurthala State
1890 births
1962 deaths
People from Málaga